Carl Owen Hubbell (June 22, 1903 – November 21, 1988), nicknamed "the Meal Ticket" and "King Carl", was an American Major League Baseball player. He was a pitcher for the New York Giants of the National League from 1928 to 1943, and remained on the team's payroll for the rest of his life, long after their move to San Francisco.

Twice voted the National League's Most Valuable Player, Hubbell was inducted into the Baseball Hall of Fame in 1947. During 1936 and 1937, Hubbell set the major league record for consecutive wins by a pitcher with 24. He is perhaps best remembered for his performance in the 1934 All-Star Game, when he struck out five future Hall of Famers – Babe Ruth, Lou Gehrig, Jimmie Foxx, Al Simmons and Joe Cronin – in succession. Hubbell's primary pitch was the screwball.

Early years

Hubbell was born in Carthage, Missouri and raised in Meeker, Oklahoma.

Minor league career
Hubbell was originally signed by the Detroit Tigers and was invited to spring training in 1926. However, pitching coach George McBride and player-manager Ty Cobb weren't impressed with him, as he had not yet developed his trademark screwball. Hubbell was sent to the Toronto Maple Leafs in the International League before the start of the season. He went 7–7 on a championship team. In 1927 he was invited to spring training again with Detroit, but the Tigers still weren't impressed and sent him two steps down the minor-league ladder, to the Decatur Commodores of the Illinois–Indiana–Iowa League. Despite a 14–7 record, the Tigers didn't invite him back for 1928, and he was sent to the Beaumont Exporters of the Texas League.

Hubbell was so fed up by this time that he told Beaumont manager Claude Robinson that he would retire and go into the oil business unless he was sold to another organization by the end of the season. Years later, he said that being unloaded by the Tigers was the best thing that ever happened to him.

Major league career
Hubbell's break came that June, when Giants scout Dick Kinsella decided to take in a game between Hubbell's Exporters and the Houston Buffs while in Houston for the 1928 Democratic National Convention. He had not planned on doing any scouting, but was impressed by Hubbell. Kinsella called Giants manager John McGraw and mentioned that he knew of Hubbell's release by Detroit, prompted in part by Cobb's concerns about the screwball. McGraw replied that Christy Mathewson had a screwball (a fadeaway, as it was called in his time) and it did not seem to affect his arm. Kinsella followed Hubbell for a month and was still impressed.

Hubbell would go 10–6 in his first major league season and would pitch his entire career for the Giants. With a slow delivery of his screwball, Hubbell recorded five consecutive 20-win seasons for the Giants (1933–37) and helped his team to three NL pennants and the 1933 World Series title. In the 1933 Series, he won two complete game victories, including an 11-inning 2–1 triumph in Game Four (the run was unearned). In six career Series starts, he was 4–2 with 32 strikeouts and a low 1.79 earned run average. Hubbell finished his career with a 253–154 record, 1677 strikeouts, 724 walks, 36 shutouts and a 2.98 ERA, in 3590 innings pitched.

As a hitter, Hubbell posted a .191 batting average (246-for-1288) with 95 runs, 30 doubles, 4 home runs, 101 RBI and 33 bases on balls. In six World Series appearances, he batted .211 (4-for-19) with 1 run and 1 RBI. Defensively, he recorded a .967 fielding percentage.

Hubbell won 24 consecutive decisions between 1936 (16) and 1937 (8), the longest such streak ever recorded in major league history. He was twice named National League MVP (1933, 1936) (1st unanimous MVP pick in 1936). He led the league in wins 3 times in 1933 (23), 1936 (26), and 1937 (22). Hubbell led the league in ERA three times in 1933 (1.66), 1934 (2.30), and 1936 (2.31). He led the league in innings pitched in 1933 (308). He led the league in strikeouts in 1937 (159).  He led the league in strikeouts per 9 innings pitched in 1938 (5.23). He led the league in shutouts in 1933 (10).  He led the league in saves in 1934 (eight, retroactively credited). He compiled a streak of 46 scoreless innings and four shutouts in 1933. He pitched a no-hitter against the Pittsburgh Pirates (11–0, May 8, 1929). He pitched an 18-inning shutout against the St. Louis Cardinals (1–0, July 2, 1933).

In its 1936 World Series cover story about Lou Gehrig and Carl Hubbell, Time depicted the Fall Classic that year between crosstown rivals Giants and Yankees as "a personal struggle between Hubbell and Gehrig", calling Hubbell "...currently baseball's No. 1 Pitcher and among the half dozen ablest in the game's annals." Time said that while he was growing up on his family's Missouri farm, he "practiced for hours...throwing stones at a barn door until he could unfailingly hit knotholes no bigger than a dime".

Hubbell was released at the end of the 1943 season. He had posted a 4–4 record that year, marking the only time he did not record double-digit wins. However, Giants owner Horace Stoneham immediately appointed him as director of player development, a post he held for 35 years. During that time, he lived in Haworth, New Jersey; he continued to live there after the Giants left New York. The last ten years of his life were spent as a Giants scout. At the time of his death, he was one of the last New York Giants still active in some capacity in baseball, and the last player from the McGraw era who was still active in the game.

All-Star Game record
In the 1934 All Star Game played at the Polo Grounds, Hubbell produced one of baseball's most memorable moments by striking out five future Hall of Famers in succession: Babe Ruth, Lou Gehrig, Jimmie Foxx, Al Simmons and Joe Cronin. This happened in an era where the strikeout was far less common than today and was regarded as an undesirable outcome for hitters, not merely an acceptable byproduct of swinging for the fences.  In 1984, the 50th anniversary of this legendary performance, Hubbell was on hand for the 1984 All-Star Game at San Francisco's Candlestick Park to throw out the first pitch, which was a screwball.

Personal life
Hubbell was married to Lucille "Sue" Harrington (1905–1967) from 1930 until her death. They had two children: Carl Jr. (born 1936) and James. Carl Jr. had a brief career in the lower minor leagues and later was a career officer in the United States Marine Corps.

Hubbell suffered a stroke while driving near his home in Mesa, Arizona on November 21, 1988, that caused him to lose control of his car and crash into a lamppost. He was taken to a hospital in Scottsdale, where he died of blunt force injuries later that day. He is interred at Meeker-Newhope Cemetery in Meeker, Oklahoma. His death came exactly 30 years after that of his teammate Mel Ott, who likewise died from an automobile accident.

Baseball honors

Hubbell was a nine-time All-Star, having been honored each year from 1933 to 1938 and then again from 1940 to 1942. In 1999, he ranked number 45 on The Sporting News list of the 100 Greatest Baseball Players, and was a nominee for the Major League Baseball All-Century Team. Hubbell was inducted into the Baseball Hall of Fame in 1947. He was the first NL player to have his number (11) retired. His number is posted on the facing of the upper deck in the left field corner at Oracle Park. In 1981, Hubbell received the Golden Plate Award of the American Academy of Achievement.

Hubbell appeared as himself in the movie Big Leaguer, and was one of the players mentioned in the poem "Line-Up for Yesterday" by Ogden Nash:

See also

List of Major League Baseball individual streaks
List of Major League Baseball career wins leaders
List of Major League Baseball annual ERA leaders
List of Major League Baseball annual saves leaders
List of Major League Baseball annual strikeout leaders
List of Major League Baseball annual wins leaders
List of Major League Baseball no-hitters
List of Major League Baseball players who spent their entire career with one franchise
Associated Press Athlete of the Year

References

External links

carlhubbell.com Official website
Encyclopedia of Oklahoma History and Culture – Hubbell, Carl

Carl Hubbell Oral History Interview (1 of 3) - National Baseball Hall of Fame Digital Collection
Carl Hubbell Oral History Interview (2 of 3) - National Baseball Hall of Fame Digital Collection
Carl Hubbell Oral History Interview (3 of 3) - National Baseball Hall of Fame Digital Collection

1903 births
1988 deaths
American sportsmen
Ardmore Bearcats players
Bartlesville Bearcats players
Baseball players from Missouri
Baseball players from Oklahoma
Beaumont Exporters players
Cushing Refiners players
Decatur Commodores players
Fort Worth Panthers players
Kansas City Blues (baseball) players
Major League Baseball farm directors
Major League Baseball pitchers
Major League Baseball players with retired numbers
National Baseball Hall of Fame inductees
National League All-Stars
National League ERA champions
National League strikeout champions
National League wins champions
National League Most Valuable Player Award winners
New York Giants (NL) executives
New York Giants (NL) players
Oklahoma City Indians players
People from Carthage, Missouri
People from Haworth, New Jersey
People from Meeker, Oklahoma
Road incident deaths in Arizona
San Francisco Giants executives
San Francisco Giants scouts
Screwball pitchers
Toronto Maple Leafs (International League) players